Benito Juarez is one of two sculptures of the Mexican president of the same name, created by Julian Martinez. One full-length statue is installed in Chicago, in the U.S. state of Illinois, and another bust is installed in Hermann Park's McGovern Centennial Gardens, in Houston, Texas. The Chicago statue replaces a previously installed bust.

Chicago

In Chicago the full-length statue of Juarez, who served as president of Mexico from 1858 to 1872, is installed in the Plaza of the Americas, along Michigan Avenue, just north of the Wrigley Building.   The 16-foot statue was donated to the city by the counsel general of Mexico in February 1999, and replaces a bust given by the Mexican President in 1977.

Houston

In Houston, the outdoor bronze bust is installed in Hermann Park's McGovern Centennial Gardens.  The sculpture was acquired by the City of Houston in 1985, having been donated by Pemex on behalf of the Mexican people.

See also
 Benito Juarez Community Academy
 History of Mexican Americans in Houston
 List of public art in Chicago
 List of public art in Houston
 Mexicans in Chicago
 Statue of Benito Juárez (New York City)
 Statue of Benito Juárez (San Diego)
 Statue of Benito Juárez (Washington, D.C.)

References

Bronze sculptures in Texas
Busts in Texas
Hermann Park
Mexican-American culture in Chicago
Mexican-American culture in Houston
Monuments and memorials in Chicago
Monuments and memorials in Texas
Outdoor sculptures in Chicago
Outdoor sculptures in Houston
Sculptures of men in Illinois
Sculptures of men in Texas
Statues in Chicago
Statues of Benito Juárez